Chiriquí is a corregimiento in David District, Chiriquí Province, Panama. Its population as of 1990 was 3,227; its population as of 2000 was 3,697.

References

Corregimientos of Chiriquí Province